More William is the second William collection in the much acclaimed Just William series by Richmal Crompton. It is a sequel to the book Just William. The book was first published in 1922, with a current edition published in 2005 by Macmillan Children's books.

Contents
Like most of the William books it has no continuous narrative, but consists of separate independent short-stories. The stories are as follows:

A Busy Day
William is given a book entitled Things a Boy Can Do and annoys his entire household by trying to carry out its instructions, along with Jimmy,a cousin with a sister called Barbara.  
Rice-Mould (The first ever story,c.1919)
In order to impress the little girl next door, William attempts to steal cream blancmange from the household kitchen.
William's Burglar
William befriends a mysterious stranger who claims to be a war veteran, but who is quite obviously a criminal.
The Knight at Arms
A Quixote-esque tale in which "Sir William" and his faithful "squire" Ginger set out to rescue a "damsel in distress".
William's Hobby
William takes up taxidermy as a hobby and puts a dead frog that he wishes to stuff in Uncle George's tea for 'Tannin'.
The Rivals
William has a rival for the affections of Joan.
The Ghost
William arranges a "psychic experience" for his cousin Mildred.
The May King
William is chosen as attendant to the May Queen (Evangeline Fish, a girl despises) in a school pageant, but he has bigger ambitions.
The Revenge
William takes revenge on his family by pretending to run away from home.
The Helper
William "helps" the removal men when his family moves house and gets stuck on the roof.
William and the Smuggler
Mr. Brown goes to the seaside for a "rest cure" but unfortunately has to endure William's company.
The Reform of William
William is inspired to lead a better life, but decides not to start just yet and on his 'last day' of his 'old life', crashes a caravan into a donkey cart.
William and the Ancient Souls
A grown-up friend of William has his life made unendurable by a new neighbour who is the President of the society of Ancient Souls.
William's Christmas Eve
William and Joan deliver a Christmas feast to a poor family whose man of the house has just been released from 'The Nick'

External links
 More William (ebook) - free download from manybooks.net
 

1922 short story collections
Just William
Short story collections by Richmal Crompton
Children's short story collections
1922 children's books
George Newnes Ltd books